Cortinarius cacaocolor is an inedible species of fungus in the genus Cortinarius. It is native to North America.

References

External links

cacaocolor
Fungi of North America
Fungi described in 1944
Inedible fungi